In Greek mythology, Melite  (Ancient Greek: Μελίτη), daughter of  Apollo, or alternatively Myrmex, was the eponym of the deme Melite in Attica. According to a scholiast on Aristophanes, Melite was a lover of Heracles who was initiated into the lesser mysteries during his stay in Attica; there was a temple of Heracles the Protector from Evil (Alexikakos) in the deme Melite. Heracles and Melite have been recognized in the figures portrayed alongside Demeter on the right half of the west pediment of the Parthenon.

Melite was also said to have been a companion of Poseidon.

Notes

References 
Suida, Suda Encyclopedia translated by Ross Scaife, David Whitehead, William Hutton, Catharine Roth, Jennifer Benedict, Gregory Hays, Malcolm Heath Sean M. Redmond, Nicholas Fincher, Patrick Rourke, Elizabeth Vandiver, Raphael Finkel, Frederick Williams, Carl Widstrand, Robert Dyer, Joseph L. Rife, Oliver Phillips and many others. Online version at the Topos Text Project.
Wilhelm Heinrich Roscher (ed.): Ausführliches Lexikon der griechischen und römischen Mythologie. Band 2. 2 (L - M), Leipzig, 1894 - 1897, ss. 2643 - 2644, u. Melite 5)

Children of Apollo
Demigods in classical mythology
Women of Heracles
Women in Greek mythology
Attican characters in Greek mythology